Johann Habermann, also Johannes Avenarius (10 August 1516 – 5 December 1590) was a German Lutheran theologian.

Life
He was born at Eger (92 m. w. of Prague) on 10 August 1516. He went over to the Lutheran Church about 1540, studied theology, and filled a number of pastorates. After a brief academic activity at Jena and Wittenberg, in 1575, he accepted a call as superintendent of Naumburg-Zeitz.

He died at Zeitz (23 m. s.w. of Leipzig) on 5 December 1590.

Works
Though praised by his contemporaries as an Old Testament exegete, his significance lies in the practical field. He published a number of sermons, a Trostbüchlein, a life of Christ, and above all the prayer-book, Christliche Gebet für alle Not und Stende der gantzen Christenheit (1565, 2. edition 1567), in which, for the first time, the prayers for various Christian needs were apportioned among the several days of the week. With a few exceptions the prayers are written in plain Biblical language, without ornament. The work was translated into Latin, English (as The Enimie of Securitie, London, 1580), and French, and was widely circulated in Protestant circles. Despite its occasional crudities of expression the book is still used; and some of the prayers have passed into church books.

References
 Jens Lyster: Johannes Avenarius (Habermann), Johannes Mathesius und Nicolaus Selnecker als Vorbilder für den dänischen Theologen und Liederdichter Hans Christensen Sthen (1999), in:  2012, page 222-233
 Jens Lyster (ed): Hans Christensen Sthens Skrifter II, Christelige og vdkaarne Bøner og En Liden Haandbog, [Habermann's prayerbook in the Danish translation from 1571 by Hans Christensen Sthen, page 13-180, comments and postscript page 181-288] edited by Jens Lyster assisted by Jens Højgård, 2003, Society for Danish Language and Literature, Copenhagen
 Jens Lyster: Avenarii bönner i Sthens oversättelse. Paa sporet af den danske bönnebogs 1. udgave 1571 [Avenarii Prayers in Sthens Translation. On the track of the first Edition of the Danish prayerbook 1571] in: Kirkehistoriske Samlinger 1976, Akademisk Forlag, Copenhagen, page 67-83.

External links
 
 
 
 Habermann's Prayerbook 1565 and 1567

1516 births
1590 deaths
People from Cheb
German Bohemian people
German Lutheran theologians
Lutheran writers
Lutheran sermon writers
German male non-fiction writers